Cyprien Despourrins (in Occitan: Ciprian Desporrins) was a Gascon-language poet from Béarn and member of the Bigorre Parliament born in Accous in 1698.

Many of his poems (written in Béarnese dialect) are famous traditional folk songs from Béarn and 18th century opera singer Pierre Jélyotte interpreted some of them for the mistress of the King of France Mme de Pompadour and the Royal Court.

Despourrins died in Argelès-Gazost in 1759.

An obelisk dedicated to Despourrins stands in his town of birth, Accous, on which are inscribed two poems; one written by Béarnese poet Xavier Navarrot, and one written by Gascon poet Jasmin.

Bibliography 
Poésies Béarnaises. Pau : Vignancourt, 1827.

External links 
 Poésie Béarnaise, béarnese anthology that begins with poem from Despourrins

1698 births
1759 deaths
People from Béarn
Gascon-language Occitan writers
Occitan-language poets